Inamdar was a feudal title prevalent before and during British Raj, including during the Maratha rule of Peshwa and other rulers of India. The title was bestowed upon to the person who received lands as Inam (grant or as gift), rewarding the extraordinary service rendered to the ruler or the princely state.

In the colonial age, the British enacted several laws which defined rights and obligations of Inamdar in their territories, like the Madras Inams Act VIII of 1869. There was a separate post of Inam Commissioner to look after revenue and records of Inam lands. There were certain Inam lands which were known as Pargana Watan Inam Lands.

Abolition and heritage 
After the independence of India, several acts were enacted in different regions to abolish rights of Inmadar and as such the Inam lands they received in grant, notably : The Bombay Personal Inams Abolition Act (XLII of 1953), The Bombay Pargana and Kukarni Watans (Abolition) Act, 1950, The Karnataka (Religious & Charitable Institutions) Inams Abolition Act, 1955, The Karnataka (Personal and Miscellaneous) Inams Abolition Act, 1977, The Karnataka Certain Inams Abolition Act, 1977, The Hyderabad Abolition of Inams Act, 1955, Madras Inam Estates (Abolition and Conversion into Ryotwari) Act, 1963, etc.

However, when the Inamdari system of holdings and Inam lands was abolished along with the feudal title of Inamdar.

References

Further reading 

Titles in India
Men's social titles
Indian feudalism